Lily Strickland (January 28, 1884 – June 6, 1958) was an American composer, painter and writer.

Biography
Lily Strickland was born on January 28, 1884, in Anderson, South Carolina. Her father was Charlton Hines Strickland and her mother was Teresa Hammond Reed. When her father died, the family moved into the home of her grandparents, Judge and Mr. J. Pinckney Reed. Strickland began studying piano at age six and began composing in her teens. She studied piano and composition at Converse College and in 1905 received a scholarship to study at the Institute of Musical Arts (later Juilliard) in New York City.

In 1912, she married Joseph Courtenay Anderson, an English teacher at Columbia University. When Anderson became manager for an American company in 1920, the couple moved to Calcutta, and spent the next ten years in India. Stickland traveled in Africa and Asia, painted and published articles in American magazines. She received an honorary doctorate in music from Converse College in 1924 in recognition of her success as a composer.

Strickland composed works that were used in the silent cinema, art song, and solo piano works. As an early ethnomusicologist, she chronicled her experiences with several musical cultures as a special correspondent for The Music Courier. Her articles include those on Ceylon (The Musical Courier, vol 86, no. 9); music at Hindu Temples (vol. 86 no. 13); "Natuch" dancing (vol. 87, no. 15); snake charmers and music (vol. 87, no. 19); "devil dancing" (vol. 87, no. 20); Tibetan Buddhist music (vol. 87, no. 21); and music related to Krishna (vol. 87, no. 22). She also published several similar articles in The Etude, and was featured by the magazines in several articles about her own compositions.

The Andersons returned to New York, and in 1948 retired to a farm near Hendersonville, North Carolina. Strickland died of a stroke on June 6, 1958.

Works
Strickland published 395 works, including popular and sacred music and children's songs. Her early compositions were influenced by spirituals and folk songs from the American South, and later works by Asian and African music. Selected works include:

Mah Lindy Lou
Ballade of la belle dame sans merci (Text: John Keats)
Love wakes and weeps (Text: Sir Walter Scott)
My lover is a fisherman (from Songs of India)

Strickland's music has been recorded and issued on CDs, including AMERICAN INDIANISTS, Vol. 2, Marco Polo (1996).

Strickland was also a prolific painter of watercolor, most of which was done during her time abroad. The largest collection of her paintings can be found at the Anderson University Art Museum, in Anderson, South Carolina.

References

External links
List of recorded songs

1884 births
1958 deaths
20th-century classical composers
American music educators
American women music educators
American women classical composers
American classical composers
People from Anderson, South Carolina
Converse University alumni
Juilliard School alumni
Musicians from South Carolina
20th-century American painters
American women painters
American women writers
Painters from South Carolina
Writers from South Carolina
American expatriates in India
20th-century American women artists
20th-century American women musicians
20th-century American composers
20th-century women composers